Monkwearmouth Academy is a state secondary school in Sunderland, Tyne and Wear, England, for pupils aged between 11 and 16. The most recent inspection report was in October 2013 and resulted in a judgement of good in all four aspects of the inspection.

Extra curricular activities
Monkwearmouth Academy offers different extra curricular activities for the students such as FILMCLUB and the student news production club, White Badger News, as well as opportunities to be on the School Council, which made various improvements to the school including refurbishment of the toilets. The school also participates in the Duke of Edinburgh's Award Scheme.

Location
The school is located in Sunderland in Tyne and Wear. The catchment area is Seaburn and the surrounding area. The site has various facilities including a swimming pool and well-resourced faculty areas.

Notable pupils

Terry Deary, author best known for writing the Horrible Histories series
Melanie Hill, actor
John Robertson, Paralympian
Ian McNaught, Merchant Navy Captain
Jill Scott, footballer who won UEFA Women's Euro 2022
Martin Smith, former footballer who made 119 league appearances for Sunderland

References

Secondary schools in the City of Sunderland
Academies in the City of Sunderland
Sunderland